Tomislav "Tomo" Česen (born 5 November 1959) is a Slovenian mountaineer who specializes in solo climbing ascents in the Alps and the Himalayas.

In 1986, aged 26, he reported that he had enchained the three Great north faces of the Alps, becoming the first person to do so solo in winter; although nobody witnessed his feat.  Česen enjoyed a period of fame and sponsorship from his enchainment, and went on to claim a number of increasingly bolder, and in some cases, groundbreaking, solo ascents, including: No Siesta on the Grandes Jorasses, Pilier Rouge du Brouillard Direttissima on Mont Blanc, Modern Times on the south face of the Marmolada, the north face of Jannu (or Kumbhakarna), and the enormous south face of Lhotse.  Many of his boldest solo ascents are now treated with skepticism in the mountaineering community, and particularly his 1990 solo ascent of Lhotse’s south face. He remains a controversial figure in climbing.

One of the main climbing routes on K2 is named the Česen Route, after him, when he soloed it in 1986; there is evidence that he probably summitted K2, and his earlier 19-hour solo ascent of Broad Peak (made in preparation for K2) is not disputed.

His son is the mountaineer, Aleš Česen.

References

Further reading
 Mark Twight, "My Way: A Short Talk with Tomo Česen" in Kiss or Kill, The Mountaineers Books, Seattle: 2001
 Greg Child, "Burden of Proof: The Tomo Česen Affair" in Postcards from the Ledge: The Collected Mountaineering Writings of Greg Child, 2000 

1959 births
Living people
Slovenian mountain climbers